Watubela may be,

Watubela archipelago
Watubela language
Utetheisa watubela (sp. moth)